U.S. Route 19 (US 19) traverses  across Western North Carolina; from the Georgia state line, at the community of Bellview, to Cane River, where US 19 splits into US 19E and US 19W, which take separate routes into Tennessee.

Route description

US 19 begins at the Georgia state line overlapped with US 129 and continues toward Cherokee as Lee Highway. ;  into North Carolina, it joins with US 64/US 74 in Ranger.  From Ranger to Andrews, the highway is a four-lane expressway that bypasses all the towns and communities along its route.  After Andrews, US 19 reverts to two-lane through the Nantahala Gorge, which both scenic and somewhat curvy  drive till Almond.

At the start of the Great Smoky Mountains Expressway, US 19 exits off towards the towns of Bryson City and Cherokee.  At Cherokee, travelers may go north on US 441 to the Great Smoky Mountains National Park or to the Blue Ridge Parkway before traveling through the rest of the Qualla Boundary.

The highway expands back into a four-lane expressway in Maggie Valley, where it then merges with the Great Smoky Mountains Expressway for  before exiting back off towards Clyde. From here, US 19 parallels with I-40 to Asheville. US 19 joins other highways in Asheville crossing over the French Broad River, then follows I-26 to Mars Hill, North Carolina. At exit 9, US 19 splits from I-26/US 23; after , US 19 splits into US 19E and US 19W at Cane River.

US 19 also make up part of Corridor A, Corridor B and Corridor K in the Appalachian Development Highway System (ADHS).  Corridor A connects I-285, in Sandy Springs, Georgia, to I-40, near Clyde, North Carolina, it overlaps  of US 19.  Corridor B connects I-40, in Asheville, North Carolina, with US 23, near Lucasville, Ohio, it overlaps  of US 19.  Corridor K connects I-75, in Cleveland, Tennessee, with US 23, in Dillsboro, North Carolina, overlapping  of US 19.  ADHS provides additional funds, as authorized by the U.S. Congress, which have enabled US 19 to benefit from the successive improvements along its routing through each corridor.  The white-on-blue banner "Appalachian Highway" is used to mark the ADHS corridor.

Dedicated and memorial names
US 19 in North Carolina has three dedicated or memorialized sections of highway.
 Great Smoky Mountains Expressway - official name of US 19, on sections that overlap with US 74 in Haywood County. (approved on September 16, 1983).
 Liston B. Ramsey Freeway - official name of US 19, on the section that overlaps with I-26 in Madison County.
 Morris L. McGough Freeway – official name of I-26/US 19/US 23 from I-240 to the Buncombe/Madison county line (approved on April 4, 2002).

Scenic byways
US 19 is part of two scenic byways in the state (indicated by a Scenic Byways sign).

Nantahala Byway is an  byway from Marble to Whittier; it traverses along the Nantahala River and Tuckasegee River.  US 19 overlaps almost the entire route, except south and east of Bryson City.  This byway also connects to the Indian Lakes Scenic Byway (at Topton and Almond via US 129 and NC 28).

Mount Mitchell Scenic Drive is an  byway from Interstate 26, through Burnsville, to the summit of Mount Mitchell State Park.  It is known for its vistas in and around the Black Mountains.  US 19 overlaps from Interstate 26 to Micaville.

History
Established in 1927, US 19 traversed from the Georgia state line (at Bellview) to the Tennessee state line (at Elk Park), roughly similar to the route seen today.  In 1930, US 19 was truncated at Cane River, where it was split into US 19E and US 19W; US 19E follows the original US 19 routing north.  In 1932, it was rerouted in Asheville from Haywood Road to Clingman Avenue, to Hilliard Avenue to Biltmore Avenue towards Broadway Street.  In 1937, US 19 was rerouted south of Almond to its current alignment today; while it was rerouted through downtown Asheville again: from Haywood Road to Clingman Avenue to Patton Avenue to College Avenue to Biltmore Avenue towards Broadway Street.

In the 1940s, additional construction work on US 19 was assured by a compromise made with the Eastern Band of Cherokee Indians in return for right-of-way through the Qualla Boundary for the Blue Ridge Parkway.

In 1947, US 19 was rerouted from Ela, traversing through Dillsboro, Sylva, and Waynesville, to Lake Junaluska.  The old route, through Cherokee and Maggie Valley became US 19A.  In 1948, it was switched, having US 19 back along the original route and US 19A going south to Lake Junaluska.

In 1949, US 19 was moved onto the Smokey Park Highway/Patton Avenue as a bypass in West Asheville.  The old alignment became US 19A (today's US 19 Business).  In 1952, US 19 was rerouted off Martins Creek Road and onto Blairsville Highway, near Ranger.  In 1954, US 19 was realigned to its current route from Lake Junaluska to Clyde and Canton;  of the old route was replaced by NC 209.  Between 1955-57, US 19 was split onto one-way streets in downtown Asheville: Northbound used Patton, to Market, to Woodfin, to Broadway; southbound used Broadway to College, to Patton.  In 1961, US 19 removed from downtown Asheville and put on the East-West Expressway, north at Marrimon Avenue.  Between 1963-68, US 19 was split onto one-way streets in downtown Canton (Park Street and Main Street).  In 1961, US 19 was moved onto new freeway west of Weaverville; the old route became US 19 Business.

In 1973, US 19 was removed from Marrimon Avenue to its current alignment north of Asheville. In 1975, the freeway US 19 traversed was extended from Weaverville to Mars Hill. In 1979, US 19 bypassed Andrews; US 19 Business replaced the old route. In 1980, US 19 bypassed Murphy; US 19 Business replaced the old route.

In 1982, NCDOT submitted a request to AASHTO to swap US 19 and US 19A between Bryson City and Lake Junaluska; opposition by businesses in the resort town of Maggie Valley, who opposed losing US 19, prevented this. In 1986, US 74 was extended west from Asheville to Chattanooga, Tennessee, which overlapped nearly all of the Great Smoky Mountains Expressway, via US 19 and US 19 Bypass; the following year, US 19 Bypass was decommissioned in favor of US 74.

On November 2, 2012, US 19/US 19E was widened from I-26 to Jacks Creek Road, just west of Burnsville.  At $107.9 million, the  two-lane mountain road was upgraded to a four-lane highway, and the first for Yancey County.  Governor Bev Perdue was on hand at the ribbon cutting ceremony opening the highway.

Future
US 19/74, from Andrews to Almond, is to be realigned onto a new multi-lane highway west of the Nantahala Gorge.  The project is broken into several sections, all subject to reprioritization.

US 19/23, from Canton to Candler, is to be widened to a multi-lane highway and its bridge replaced over the Pigeon River.  This project is currently funded.

US 19, in concurrency with Interstate 26 and US 23, is planned to be realigned onto a new interchange at Interstate 240 and freeway improvements north from it.  Right-of-way purchases are to begin in 2023, however the project is unfunded.

Two bridges over Richland Creek are planned to be replaced in Lake Junaluska, and the interchange with US 23/74 is to be redesigned to make it safer.

Junction list

See also

 Special routes of U.S. Route 19

References

External links

 
 NCRoads.com: US 19
 NCRoads.com: US 19A
 NCRoads.com: US 19E
 NCRoads.com: US 19W
 NCRoads.com: US 19 Business

19
 North Carolina
Transportation in Cherokee County, North Carolina
Transportation in Graham County, North Carolina
Transportation in Swain County, North Carolina
Transportation in Jackson County, North Carolina
Transportation in Haywood County, North Carolina
Transportation in Buncombe County, North Carolina
Transportation in Madison County, North Carolina
Transportation in Yancey County, North Carolina